Michigan Bar was a former mining camp near the Cosumnes River in Sacramento County, California. The town site was founded in 1849 at Michigan, where it gets its name. By the 1850s the population figure was around 1500 people. Today the original site of the town has been destroyed by hydraulic mining.

It is also California Historical Landmark #468.

References

Former settlements in Sacramento County, California
Mining communities of the California Gold Rush
California Historical Landmarks
Cosumnes River
Ghost towns in California